Dumal or Dumala is a community found in Orissa, they are the Landlords . They give ground to people for cultivation & get the money(Khajana) from them , so their occupation is agriculture. they call themselves as Dumala. They are distributed through the Boudh, Phulbani, Balangir, Sonepur, Bargarh, Sambalpur, Nayagarh, Cuttack, Angul and Debgarh districts.
This caste is categorised as an Other Backward Class (OBC) according to Reservation system of India.

Origin
The caste originally came from Orissa. Its name was derived from the village of Dumba Hadap in the former Athmallik state.

Another explanation of its origin is that Dumal is derived from Duma, the name of the gateway in Baudh town, which they lived near. Sir H. Risley wrote, “The Dumals or Jadupuria seems to be a group of local formation. They cherish the tradition that their ancestors came to Orissa from Jadupur, but this appears to be nothing more than the name of Yadavs/Jadavas, the mythological progenitors of the Yaduvanshi caste transformed into the name of an imaginary town."

Another legend states that when Lord Rama was wandering in the forests of Sambalpur, he met three brothers and asked each one to bring him a cup of water. The first brother brought water in a clean brass pot, his name was Sudh (well-mannered). The second brother made a cup out of leaves and drew water from a well using a rope, his name was Dumal, from dori-mal (a coil of rope). The third brother brought water in a hollow gourd, and his name was Kolta, from ku-rita (ill-mannered). This shows Kulta, Dumal, and Sudh have some connections.

References

Sources 

Paper submitted by Mr Parmanada Tiwari, Extra assistant commissioner and Assistant settlement officer, Sambalpur
Paper drawn up by Mr. Rai Bahadur Hira Lal, Extra Assistant Commissioner
The Tribes And Castes of the Central Provinces of India By R. V. Russell
The tribes and castes of the central provinces of India, Volume 1 - Page 538 By R.V. Russell, R.B.H. Lai

Social groups of Odisha